Barbara Shermund (June 26, 1899 – September 9, 1978) was an American cartoonist whose work appeared in The New Yorker from its first year in 1925. She was one of the first three women cartoonists inducted into the National Cartoonists Society in 1950.

Early life and education
Barbara Shermund was born in San Francisco on June 26, 1899. Her father, Henry Shermund, was an architect and her mother, Fredda Cool, was a sculptor. Shermund's talent emerged very early in her life and her parents encouraged her to follow her passion. She attended the California School of Fine Arts and studied painting and printmaking. Her first artwork was published when she was nine years old on the San Francisco Chronicles children's page under the title 'On the farm'. In 1911, she published a short story for a writing contest in The San Francisco Call. She moved to New York in 1925 after her mother's death from Spanish flu. Initially she stayed with friends, either in New York City or in Woodstock. When her father remarried, it was to a woman who was eight years younger than her.

Cartoon career
Shermund began her career in New York by creating spot illustrations. Her first cartoon appeared in January 1926. She created covers, illustration and cartoons for Esquire, Life and Collier's. 

In February 1925, Harold Ross launched The New Yorker as a humorous Manhattan-centric magazine. Shermund supplied a cover in June and in October and she became a frequent contributor. Over 600 of her cartoons were published in The New Yorker and also contributed nine cover illustrations for the magazine. Shermund wrote her own captions under her cartoons. Her creations were satirical and often had a feminist and poignant tone reflecting the early 20th century view of the New Woman. One cartoon showed two men seated by a fire with the caption, "Well, I guess women are just human beings after all." 

Shermund's classical training characterised her style. Her cartoons can be identified by their bold, loose lines. She used pencil and brush and she sketched a first draft on heavy 24 x 36 inch watercolour paper. Unlike other artists, She did not have a studio and she used to draw at her kitchen table. Her work evolved along with the magazine. In the 1930s, her style started to change. Her strong female voice altered as the magazine evolved. By the 1940s, her cartoons were stylised and less realistic with less poignant captions. From 1944 to 1957, she produced "Shermund's Sallies", a syndicated cartoon panel for Pictorial Review, the arts and entertainment section of Hearst's many Sunday newspapers. Shermund, Hilda Terry and Edwina Dumm were the first three women cartoonists inducted into the National Cartoonists Society in 1950. Shermund continued to draw at her home in Sea Bright, New Jersey, until shortly before her death.

Death and legacy
Shermund died in a nursing home in Middletown Township, New Jersey, in 1978 after losing contact with her family. 35 years later, when her niece searched for Shermund's burial site, she was surprised to find that her ashes remained in a nursing home. In 2018, her niece helped to crowdfund the burial of the ashes and the erection of a headstone. In 2022, the New York Times published a belated obituary for Shermund.

References

External links
Over 80 images of Shermund's cartoons at the Billy Ireland Cartoon Library

American cartoonists
American women cartoonists
Artists from San Francisco
1899 births
1978 deaths